Urban coyotes  are coyotes that reside in North American metropolitan areas (major cities and their suburbs). Coyotes thrive in suburban settings and urban regions, because of the availability of food and the lack of predators. One report described them as "thriving" in U.S. cities, and a 2013 report in The Economist suggested that urban coyotes were increasingly living in cities and suburbs.

Adaptations to urban environments
Wildlife ecologists at Ohio State University studied coyotes living in Chicago over a seven-year period (2000–2007) and found that coyotes have adapted well to living in densely populated urban environments while avoiding contact with humans. They found that urban coyotes tend to live longer than their rural counterparts, kill rodents and small pets, and live anywhere from parks to industrial areas. The researchers estimated that there are up to 2,000 coyotes living in the Chicago metropolitan area and that this circumstance may well apply to many other urban areas in North America. 

In Washington, D.C.'s Rock Creek Park, coyotes den and raise their young, scavenge roadkill, and hunt rodents. "I don't see it as a bad thing for a park," the assigned National Park Service biologist told a reporter for Smithsonian Magazine. "I see it as good for keeping animal populations in control, like the squirrels and the mice."

Unlike rural coyotes, urban ones have a longer lifespan and tend to live in higher densities but rarely attack humans and can be frightened away by arm waving or loud noises. The animals generally are nocturnal and prey upon rabbits, rats, Canada geese, fruit, insects and family pets, especially small dogs and domestic cats. A study of southern California coyotes found that urban coyotes consumed human food, domestic cats, and landscape plants (including fruits and seeds) at a significantly higher rate than suburban coyotes. Analysis of urban coyote scat found that their most common food source was anthropogenic resources, namely edible plantings cultivated by humans (particularly figs, palm fruit and grapes), litter/refuse, and domestic cats. They also consumed gophers, ground squirrels (but rarely rats or mice), rabbits and birds. Meanwhile, the diet of suburban coyotes included a much higher proportion of native mammals, primarily rabbits. 

Coyotes in all Canadian provinces can be attracted to food left out for birds, or prey upon stray cats, and tend to live between apartment buildings and in industrial parks throughout major cities from Vancouver through Toronto and all the way to St. John's. 

”We rarely think about storm drains, power line rights of way, or railroad tracks, but these are coyote highways, linking one habitat to another,” note the authors of Wild L.A.: Explore the Amazing Nature in and Around Los Angeles. 

Coyotes tend to be opportunistic and clever, according to one view. 

One study in Tucson, Arizona found that urban coyotes had similar antibodies and pathogens to coyotes in general, and had a survival rate in the city of 72% for any given year, on average. A study in 2007 suggested that coyotes were "successful in adjusting to an urbanized landscape" with high survival rates, and are frequently in "close proximity" to people.  

Both studies suggested that a major cause of deaths of urban coyotes was collisions with motorized vehicles.

Management 
A researcher studying the impact of coyotes in the city of Austin, Texas found that urban coyote management techniques, including steps to trap and remove coyotes who were exhibiting bold or aggressive behavior, as well as efforts to educate the public about not feeding the animals, had had a positive effect in lessening possible risk to humans or to pets.

California and Vermont ban coyote hunting contests.

In order to ensure that urban coyotes remain afraid of humans, Edmonton, Canada announced that volunteers would "make a ruckus" if coyotes do not run away when initially approached.

Specific urban coyotes
A coyote nicknamed "Hal" made his way to New York City's Central Park in March 2006, wandering about the park for at least two days before being captured by officials. New York City parks commissioner Adrian Benepe noted this coyote had to be very adventurous and curious to get so far into the city. In 2015, there were reports of coyotes howling at night in Central Park. 

An incident occurred in April 2007 in the Chicago Loop district, where a coyote, later nicknamed "Adrian", quietly entered a Quizno's restaurant during the lunch hours; it was later captured and released at a wildlife rehabilitation center near Barrington, Illinois. In February 2010, up to three coyotes were spotted on the Columbia University campus in New York City, and another coyote sighting occurred in Central Park. Up to ten coyotes have also been living and breeding in San Francisco's Golden Gate Park.

Coyotes were reportedly living underneath decks in suburban Stamford, Connecticut and in some instances chasing after large dogs.

Attacks and fatalities

Urban coyotes are among the large carnivores known to prey on humans. There have been two recorded human fatalities attributed to coyote attacks.

References

External links 

 Coyote Cacher - report California coyote sightings
 Urban Coyote Research Project - research and management
 Arizona Game & Fish Department, "Living with Coyotes"
 Portland Urban Coyote Project

Coyotes in human culture
coyote